Causality is a game by British studio Loju. The game is about guiding a group of astronauts to safety. It was released on Steam and later on the iOS App Store.

Gameplay 
The challenge for the player is to guide a group of astronauts to safety, and so complete a level. This is done by using directional cues, portals and time manipulation. The player has to guide the astronauts (which move automatically) to colored end spaces in a variety of environments (such as crystal caves and hazy forests).  The player has to complete the level in a certain time frame. As the player advances through a level they can go back in time to find a better solution. There is also a restart button which allows the player to start the level from the beginning.

Reception 

The game received mostly positive reviews. Gamezebo gave the game 4 stars out of 5 praising the fact it was "very challenging and will satisfy hardcore puzzle fans" and that the game had "nice visuals and soundtrack" while criticizing the fact it is "very challenging and may frustrate casual puzzle fans" and has no instructions. GameGrin gave the game a rating of 4.5 out of 10 saying the game "bludgeons freedom into a pulp and annihilates any semblance of player choice, denying any puzzle experimentation and making for one extremely unappealing game". AllAgeGaming called it "worth checking out if you like puzzle games". Pocket Gamer praised the fact that the game "lets you solve its puzzles at your pace".

See also
 Cosmic Express

References

External links 

2017 video games
Android (operating system) games
IOS games
Linux games
MacOS games
Puzzle video games
Video games developed in the United Kingdom
Video games set in outer space
Windows games